Luc Franck Leo Chevrier (born 30 June 1999) is a Saint Lucian sailor. He competed in the Laser event at the 2020 Summer Olympics.

References

External links
 
 

1999 births
Living people
Saint Lucian male sailors (sport)
Olympic sailors of Saint Lucia
Sailors at the 2020 Summer Olympics – Laser
Sailors at the 2014 Summer Youth Olympics
Place of birth missing (living people)